Av Norrøn Ætt is Helheim's 2nd full-length album, released in 1997.

Guest Appearance: - Haldis: Violin, Belinda: Sopran & Trumpet

Track listing
En Forgangen Tid (A Bygone Era) – 2:54
Vinterdøden (The Winter-death) – 10:21
Fra Ginnunga-gap Til Evig Tid (From Ginnungagap To Eternal Time) – 6:49
Mørk, Evig Vinter (Dark, Eternal Winter) – 9:24
Åpenbaringens Natt (The Night of Revelation) – 7:26
De Eteriske Åndevesenes Skumringsdans (The Ethereal Spirit-creatures' Twilight-dance) – 8:46
Av Norrøn Ætt (Of Norse Lineage) – 9:36

Helheim (band) albums
1997 albums